Words Without Borders (WWB) is an international magazine open to international exchange through translation, publication, and promotion of the world's best writing and authors who are not easily accessible to English-speaking readers. The first issue appeared in July–August 2003.

Translation and knowledge
Words Without Borders promotes cultural understanding through the translation, publication, and promotion of the finest contemporary international literature. It publishes a monthly magazine of literature in translation and organizes special events that connect foreign writers to the public; it also develops materials for high school and college teachers and provides an online resource center for contemporary global writing. Words without Borders is supported by the National Endowment for the Arts, the New York State Council on the Arts and the Lannan Foundation, among others. Words without Borders was founded by Alane Salierno Mason, translator of Elio Vittorini, in 1999 and began publication in 2003.

David Orr, in The New York Times, compliments the "intelligence and idealism" of WWB.

Prominent authors 
Words Without Borders has featured many authors from around the globe, translating their works for English-speaking readers, including:

 Juan José Millás (2003)
 Ingo Schulze (2003)
 Adonis (2003)
 Adam Zagajewski (2004)
 Elena Ferrante (2005)
 Alain Mabanckou (2005)
 Georges-Olivier Châteaureynaud (2005)
 Svetlana Alexievich (2005)
 Ko Un (2005)
 Olga Tokarczuk (2005)
 Tahar Ben Jelloun (2006)
 Jon Fosse (2006)
 Ismail Kadare (2006)
 José Eduardo Agualusa (2007)
 Herta Müller (2009)
 Glaydah Namukasa (2013)
 Radka Denemarková (2014)
 Rasha Abbas (2014)
 Fouad Laroui (2016)
 Yolanda Arroyo Pizarro (2019) 
 Lina Meruane (2019)
 Nona Fernández (2019)

See also
 American Literary Translators Association
 International Federation of Translators
 Without Borders

References

External links
 

2003 establishments in New York City
Literary translation magazines
Literary translation websites
Magazines established in 2003
Magazines published in New York City
Monthly magazines published in the United States
Online literary magazines published in the United States